The 1901 Florida Agricultural College football team represented the Florida Agricultural College in the sport of American football during the 1901 college football season. This was not the modern Florida Gators of the University of Florida in Gainesville, which begins in 1906, but one of its four predecessor institutions.

The team played the first intercollegiate football game in the state of Florida against the Stetson Hatters in Jacksonville as part of the State Fair. Stetson won 6–0, after a sure FAC score was obstructed by a tree stump.

The team's first team was organized in 1899, but it found nobody to play.

Schedule

See also
List of the first college football game in each US state

References

Florida
College football winless seasons
Florida Agricultural College football seasons
Florida Agricultural College football